Sir Selwyn John Cushing  (born 1 September 1936) is a New Zealand accountant and businessman.

Early life and family
Cushing was born in Hastings on 1 September 1936, the only child of a manager at the Whakatu freezing works. He was educated at Hastings Boys' High School. In 1964, he married Kaye Dorothy Anderson, and the couple went on to have two children. His wife died in 1986.

Cushing represented Hawke's Bay in cricket, and is also an accomplished violinist.

Career
Cushing qualified as a chartered accountant, and became involved in corporate governance as a director and chair of some of New Zealand's largest and most well-known public companies and state-owned enterprises. Such companies included Brierley Investments, Air New Zealand, Carter Holt Harvey, Mount Cook Group, Electricity Corporation of New Zealand, the New Zealand Symphony Orchestra, and Skellerup. He stepped down from the board of the latter company in 2017.

In 2018, the Cushing family was estimated to be worth $235 million.

Honours and awards
In the 1994 Queen's Birthday Honours, Cushing was appointed a Companion of the Order of St Michael and St George, for services to business management, and in the 1999 New Year Honours he was made a Knight Companion of the New Zealand Order of Merit, for services to business, sport and the arts.

References

1936 births
Living people
People from Hastings, New Zealand
People educated at Hastings Boys' High School
New Zealand businesspeople
New Zealand Companions of the Order of St Michael and St George
Knights Companion of the New Zealand Order of Merit
Businesspeople awarded knighthoods